Amphistephanites is an extinct genus of cephalopod belonging to the ammonite subclass.

References 

 The Paleobiology Database

Ammonite genera
Noritoidea